Alfred Viggo Emil Andreasen (later Fjordvald; 4 September 1895 – 26 May 1972) was a Danish boxer who competed in the 1920 Summer Olympics. He was born and died in Copenhagen. In 1920 he was eliminated in the quarter-finals of the light heavyweight class after losing his fight to Hugh Brown.

References

External links
profile

1895 births
1972 deaths
Sportspeople from Copenhagen
Light-heavyweight boxers
Olympic boxers of Denmark
Boxers at the 1920 Summer Olympics
Danish male boxers